Uyalovo (Uyal) is a rural locality (a village) in Akbarisovsky Selsoviet, Sharansky District, Bashkortostan, Russia. The population was 159 as of 2010. There are 3 streets.

Geography 
Uyalovo is located 9 km northeast of Sharan (the district's administrative centre) by road. Ursayevo is the nearest rural locality.

References 

Rural localities in Sharansky District